George Robert Preas (June 25, 1933 – February 24, 2007) was an American football lineman in the National Football League for the Baltimore Colts.

Preas grew up in Roanoke, Virginia and played high school football at Jefferson High School, graduating in 1951.  He went on to star at Virginia Tech, and was inducted as a member of the Virginia Tech Sports Hall of Fame in 1983, the second year Tech honored its former athletes. 

He was  drafted by the Baltimore Colts, and played offensive tackle for the Colts from 1955–65, alongside teammates like quarterback Johnny Unitas, receiver Raymond Berry, running back Lenny Moore, left tackle Jim Parker, defensive tackle Art Donovan and defensive end Gino Marchetti.

Preas died in the South Roanoke Nursing Home in 2007.

1933 births
2007 deaths
Sportspeople from Roanoke, Virginia
Players of American football from Virginia
American football defensive ends
American football offensive guards
American football offensive tackles
Virginia Tech Hokies football players
Baltimore Colts players